Frederick Cayley Robinson  (18 August 1862 – 4 January 1927) was an English artist who created paintings and applied art, including book illustrations and theatre set designs. Cayley Robinson continued to paint striking Pre-Raphaelite and Victorian subjects well into the twentieth century despite this approach becoming deeply unfashionable.

His series of large-scale mural paintings for the Middlesex Hospital entitled Acts of Mercy commissioned around 1915 and completed in 1920 are some of his most impressive works, along with Pastoral, 1923, (Tate Britain, London), which was bought by the Chantrey Bequest for the nation. However his many smaller paintings, particularly of interiors featuring sombre women as well as the theme of departure, are significant works of modern British art.

Biography 

Born on 18 August 1862, in Brentford-on-Thames, Middlesex, Frederick Cayley Robinson was the son of an engineer. He studied at the St. John's Wood Art School, London, and from 1885 to 1888 at the Royal Academy Schools. Early on, Cayley Robinson painted scenes of the sea in the fashionable Newlyn style, and from 1889 to 1891 he sailed in a boat around Britain.

When he returned, Cayley Robinson studied at the Académie Julian in Paris from 1891-1894. The artist's time studying at the académie had a critical influence on his entire artistic output, which displays the influence of European Symbolism, especially the avant-garde group the Nabis and the revival of interest in Edward Burne-Jones in Paris at this time. Like many of his peers, Cayley Robinson felt drawn to a new style of art, moving away from modern impressionism and appearing to emulate the visionary medievalism of the Pre-Raphaelites. 

Various connections - for example with the Glasgow School of Art, and within the circle of Charles Ricketts and Charles Shannon - brought Cayley Robinson closer to the occult revival of the period, including the Golden Dawn and esotericism. This context also infused his artworks. From the late 1890s, Cayley Robinson developed his own distinctive oeuvre of artistic expression which combined simple, quiet domesticity – the everyday - with hints of the occult, the mysterious, and the wondrous.

Cayley Robinson married the painter Winifred Lucy Dalley in 1898 and they had one daughter. From 1898 to 1901, like many artists of the period, Cayley Robinson visited Florence and during that time studied the Old Masters and techniques such as tempera. In 1904, he became a founder member of the Society of Painters in Tempera. This brought him in contact with a number of other like-minded artists, notably Mary Sargant Florence and Lady Christiana Herringham, both of whom were involved with the suffrage movement.

A central theme of Cayley Robinson’s paintings was enchantment. He produced very popular illustrations and set designs for the Haymarket Theatre production in London of Maurice Maeterlinck's The Blue Bird in 1910. In the period 1907-1914, Cayley Robinson was connected with the London based Art Theosophical Circle, a group which sought forms of artistic enchantment in the modern world. The artist contributed illustrations for their published journal Orpheus. 

In 1914, Cayley Robinson moved with his family into 1 Lansdowne House, Lansdowne Road, Kensington, London. This was a custom-built studio apartment block inhabited solely by artists. In the same year, the artist took up his only teaching professorship, at the Glasgow School of Art, which he held for ten years. 

Frederick Cayley Robinson died of influenza on 4 January 1927 in a nursing home at 1 Ladbroke Square, Kensington; he was survived by his wife.

Exhibitions 
During his lifetime, Cayley Robinson regularly exhibited at the Royal Academy and the Society of British Painters and held several important solo shows. 

Whilst neglected for much of the twentieth century, there has been an increase in the exhibition of Cayley Robinson's work in the twenty-first century:

2006-7: Chasing Happiness at the Fitzwilliam Museum, Cambridge, which displayed his illustrations for Maurice Maeterlinck's The Blue Bird

2010: the National Gallery displayed six works by Cayley Robinson including the four panels of the Acts of Mercy mural series, which had been rescued and purchased by the Wellcome Trust in 2007

2022-23: Many of Cayley Robinson’s artworks featured in the exhibition Modern Pre-Raphaelite Visionaries: British Art, 1880-1930  at the Leamington Spa Art Gallery, 13th May - 18th September 2022 and the Watts Gallery, Compton from October 2022- February 2023). A publication entitled Modern Pre-Raphaelite Visionaries: British Art, 1880-1930 was produced to coincide with the exhibition.

Further reading

Gallery

External links 

 
 National Gallery exhibition 2010 
 Review of the 2010 Tate exhibition Evening Standard
 Review of the 2010 Tate exhibition The Guardian
 Slideshow of the 'Acts of Mercy' The Guardian
 Wellcome Collection Library Catalogue

19th-century English painters
English male painters
20th-century English painters
Modern painters
1927 deaths
1862 births
Deaths from influenza
People from Brentford
Associates of the Royal Academy
Alumni of the Royal Academy Schools
20th-century English male artists
19th-century English male artists